Drągowski (feminine: Drągowska, plural: Drągowscy), sometimes spelled Drongowski, is a Polish surname. It may refer to:

 Bartłomiej Drągowski (born 1997), Polish footballer
 Dariusz Drągowski (born 1970), Polish footballer

See also
 

Polish-language surnames